Omoboriowo is a Yoruba surname meaning "Child is more valuable than money". Notable people with the surname include:

 Akin Omoboriowo, Nigerian politician
 Bayo Omoboriowo, Nigerian photographer